The 2007–08 season was the 3rd season of competitive football played by Central Coast Mariners. The Mariners ended the season as A-League Premiers after topping the table in the regular season, but runners-up in the Championship after losing to local rivals Newcastle Jets in the 2008 A-League Grand Final.

In the transfer window the club signed experienced striker Sasho Petrovski and former Adelaide United midfielder Greg Owens. Left back Dean Heffernan also returned to the club after completing a loan spell with 1. FC Nürnberg. Club captain Noel Spencer was released, joining Sydney FC.

After a mixed pre-season, finishing fourth in the 2007 A-League Pre-Season Challenge Cup, the Mariners began the 2007–08 A-League in good form, undefeated for their first five games. Winless runs in October and January saw a number of clubs threaten Central Coast at the top of the table. This included a 5–4 loss to Sydney FC in December, breaking the record for goals in an A-League match. The mid-season addition of Socceroo John Aloisi proved successful, with the striker scoring a team-high seven league goals. A win over Wellington Phoenix in the final game of the regular season secured a first Premiership for the club, ahead of Newcastle Jets on goal difference. In the Finals Series, the Mariners advanced to the Grand Final by defeating the Jets 3–2 over two legs. The Jets, however, claimed the Championship with a 1–0 win in controversial circumstances at the Sydney Football Stadium.

Background 

The Mariners ended the previous season in sixth, missing out on the Finals Series.

Transfers 
In

Out

Pre-season

A-League Pre-Season Challenge Cup

Group stage

Playoffs

2007–08 Hyundai A-League fixtures

2007–08 Finals series

Home-and-Away Season

Player statistics 
Key

No. = Squad number

Pos = Playing position

Nat. = Nationality

Apps = Appearances

GK = Goalkeeper

DF = Defender

MF = Midfielder

FW = Forward

 = Yellow cards

 = Red cards

Numbers in parentheses denote appearances as substitute. Players with number struck through and marked  left the club during the playing season.

References

External links

Central Coast Mariners FC seasons
Central Coast Mariners Season, 2007-08